Since being discovered by BT in the mid 1990s's, Jan Johnston has frequently performed as guest vocalist on many dance tracks, the majority of which have been released, with others that have not been. A full list is set out below.
Jan Johnston wrote all the songs. She is the songwriter and vocalists

Collaborations (Singles)

Album collaborations
In addition to the singles she has provided vocals for, Jan has also provided vocals to some artist albums with some of the tracks being released as singles.

Unreleased works
Johnston has written and recorded many other tracks with various artists which have gone on to be unreleased or even released on promotional copies.

Unreleased solo works

The majority of Jan Johnston's solo back catalogue has never been commercially released. Many of her recordings for Perfecto were issued on promotional copies as part of the aborted Emerging album campaign, whilst the majority for other labels have never even been released on promotional copies and are listed below.

 "Out There" (written with Tony Kirkham)
 "Crave" (1999) (written with Rob Davis)
 "Religion" (1999) (later remixed and renamed as "Halo")
 "Sunshine", "Mortal (Take Me Off the Planet)" and "Right to Be Miserable" (written and recorded with Jamie Myerson)
 "An Angel In His Eyes", "Anyway I Want", Beautiful Chains That Bind", "Captured", "Go Away", "Never Be Enough", "No Rules", "Pure Trip", "Waiting for No-one", "Don't Be a Stranger", "Crawling Across You", "Animal Zoo", "Bubble", "Slow Moving Together", "Starwatcher", "This Is My Dream", "Uncut Version", "Vibes in the Carpark",  and "Energy"
 "No Mistake" (written with Mark James)
 "Crazy a Free Spirit" (written with Andi Red and Colin Snape)
 "Do I Confuse You" and "I'll Go No Protest" (written with Lazy - a.k.a. Kiran Shahani)
 "Breath" (written with Shelly Peiken and Sandy Stewart)
 "An Innocent Way" and "Beautiful" (written with James Exley)
 "Faking Smiles" and "Not Mine" (2004) (written and recorded with Uke & Kimik)
 "Close Your Eyes and Focus" (written with Skyko Tavis)
 "Kiss the Silence" (2011)

References

Musical collaborations